Emre Vefa Göktaş (born 24 June 1998) is a Turkish karateka competing in the kata discipline of karate. He is a member of Kağıthane Belediyesi SK. He studies in Gazi University Physical Education and Sports Academy.

He won the bronze medal in the team kata  event at the 2018 European Karate Championships held in Novi Sad, Serbia, the silver medal in the same event at the 2019 European Championships in Guadalajara, Spain, and the gold medal again in the same  event at the 2021 European Championships in Poreč, Croatia.

He won the bronze medal in the Team kata  event at the 2021 World Karate Championships held in Dubai,  United Arab Emirates.

References

1998 births
Living people
Turkish male karateka
21st-century Turkish people
20th-century Turkish people